Justinianopolis Nova may refer to:
Justinianopolis Nova (Bithynia)
Justinianopolis Nova (Cappadocia)